Gynnidomorpha datetis is a species of moth of the  family Tortricidae. It is found in China in the provinces of Anhui, Guizhou, Hebei, Henan, Shandong, Shaanxi, Tianjin as well as Thailand.

The wingspan is 10.5−13 mm.

References

Moths described in 1984
Cochylini